Nikolai Petrovich Petrov (Russian: Николай Петрович Петров; 18 September 1834, in Saint Petersburg – 25 July 1876, in Ariccia) was a Russian genre painter; one of the founders of the Artel of Artists.

Biography 
He was born to a middle-class family and attended the Imperial Academy of Fine Arts, where he studied under Alexey Markov and was awarded several small silver medals. In 1860, he won a large silver medal for his painting of three fables by Ivan Krylov. In 1862, he was awarded a gold medal for his canvas "Courting the Tailor's Daughter", which remains one of his most familiar works.

The following year, he was one of the graduate students who participated in the "Revolt of the Fourteen"; refusing to compete for a special gold medal on the occasion of the Academy's 100th anniversary, in protest of the school's continued adherence to what they felt were outmoded styles and teaching methods. Later, they and joined together to form the "Artel of Artists", an organization devoted to promoting Realism in the arts.

Through the aegis of the Artel, he received numerous commissions. He was also involved in church decoration projects in Kronstadt, Ostrogozhsk, Oskol and Yekaterinodar and painted portraits of the nobility. For a time, he operated his own drawing school. In 1867, despite his participation in the Revolt, the Academy named him an "Academician" for his work, "Farmer in Distress".

In 1873, he began to show the symptoms of tuberculosis. In an effort to regain his health, he moved to Italy, spent some time studying the Old Masters, and created genre scenes on Italian subjects. The climate failed to improve his illness, however, and he died from it in 1876. He was buried at the Cimitero Acattolico in Rome, not far from his fellow Russian painters, Pimen Orlov and Karl Bryullov.

Selected paintings

References

Literary sources

External links 

1834 births
1876 deaths
19th-century painters from the Russian Empire
19th-century deaths from tuberculosis
Russian male painters
Russian genre painters
Painters from Saint Petersburg
Tuberculosis deaths in Italy
Infectious disease deaths in Lazio
19th-century male artists from the Russian Empire